John Hutchings may refer to:
John Fenwick Hutchings, British Royal Navy officer
Johnny Hutchings (1916–1963), American baseball player
John Hutchings, a victim of the Icarus affair
 John Bacon Hutchings (1859–1916), architect and father of E.T. Hutchings